Le Roncenay-Authenay is a former commune in the Eure department in northern France. On 1 January 2016, it was merged into the new commune of Mesnils-sur-Iton.

Population

See also
Communes of the Eure department

References

Former communes of Eure